The Réunion stonechat (Saxicola tectes) is a species of stonechat, endemic to the island of Réunion. This small passerine bird is common in clearings and open mountain bushlands there up to 2600 metres above the sea level, including in the plains around Piton de la Fournaise.

Description
Overall, the male is black above and white below, but also with a white supercilium (sometimes absent), half-collar, and greater covert patch, and a variable-sized orange patch on the breast. Females differ from males in being browner above, more buff-toned below, and often lacking the white greater covert patch. The white throat and (usually white) supercilium are the most prominent external differences from the African stonechat S. torquatus, which has a wholly black head including the throat and supercilium.

Taxonomy and etymology
It is a member of the common stonechat superspecies, but it is distinct, together with its closest relative the Madagascar stonechat S. sibilla being insular derivatives of the African stonechat. Its ancestors probably diverged from the sub-Saharan African lineage as it spread across the continent some 2–2.5 mya during the Late Pliocene.

The etymology of the scientific name is from Saxicola, "rock-dweller", from Latin saxum, a rock + incola, dwelling in; and tectes, onomatopoetic New Latin after the species' call, from the Réunion Creole name tec-tec.

References

External links
Xeno-canto: audio recordings of the Réunion stonechat

Saxicola
Birds described in 1789
Taxa named by Johann Friedrich Gmelin
Birds of Réunion